The Obion County Courthouse is a historic building in Union City, Tennessee. It serves as the courthouse of Obion County, Tennessee.

The building was the third courthouse built for Obion County. The first one was built in Troy, Tennessee in 1890 and subsequently moved to Union City. A second courthouse was built in Union City. The third and current courthouse was built in 1939.

The building was designed in the PWA Moderne architectural style by Marr & Holman. It has been listed on the National Register of Historic Places since March 30, 1995.

References

National Register of Historic Places in Obion County, Tennessee
Government buildings completed in 1939
Courthouses on the National Register of Historic Places in Tennessee
County courthouses in Tennessee
1939 establishments in Tennessee
PWA Moderne architecture